Donald Brown may refer to:

Academics
 Donald F. Brown (archaeologist) (1908–2014), American archaeologist

 Donald Brown (anthropologist) (born 1934), American professor of anthropology
 Donald D. Brown, American science professor

Arts and entertainment
 Donald Brown (musician) (born 1954), American jazz musician
 Don Brown (author) (born 1960), American novelist
 Don Brown (voice actor) (born 1964), Canadian voice actor
 Don Brown (children's author), American children's book author and illustrator

Politics
 Don Brown (Australian politician) (born 1981), member of the Queensland Parliament
 Donald Ferguson Brown (1903–1959), Canadian politician, barrister and lawyer
 Donald Cameron Brown (1892–1963), Canadian politician in the Legislative Assembly of British Columbia

Sports
 Don Brown (American football coach) (born 1955), American college football coach
 Donald Brown (defensive back) (born 1963), American football defensive back 
 Donald Brown (running back) (born 1987), American football running back
 Don Brown (running back) (1937–2013), former American football player in the American Football League
 Don Brown (Australian footballer) (born 1953), Australian rules footballer
 Donald Brown (Canadian football) (born 1985), Canadian football defensive back

Other
 Donald Forrester Brown (1890–1916), New Zealand Victoria Cross recipient
 Donald R. Brown (died 2009), first African American to attend dental school at the University of Missouri–Kansas City School of Dentistry
 Donald Brown (programmer), computer programmer and creator of the Eamon game series

See also
 Don Browne, American television executive
 Don Browne (cricketer) (1892–1975), Barbadian cricketer